Karin Albou is a French-Algerian female director, writer, editor, producer and actress.

Early life
Karin Albou was born on March 12, 1968 in Neuilly-sur-Seine to Jewish Algerian immigrant parents. Her mother was only 16 when she was born.

In 1999 she moved to Tunisia. A year later, she returned to Paris and started her career as a filmmaker and as a writer.

As a child, Albou was always involved with dance and singing. After high school, Karin continued to study dance, but also studied literature and drama, eventually enrolling in a film school in Paris. She studied screenwriting but discovered she wanted to be a director while taking classes at École Supérieure de Réalisation Audiovisuelle. After graduating, she released her first short film, Hush!.

Career
Albou made her feature film debut in 2005 with Little Jerusalem, which debuted at the 2005 Cannes Film Festival in the International Critics' Week. Despite being Albou's first feature film, she was disqualified from competing for the Camera d'Or, awarded to the best first film playing at the festival, because she had previously directed a made-for-TV movie.

In 2008 Albou released her second feature film The Wedding Song, a Holocaust drama set in Tunisia in 1942 that was loosely inspired by letters Albou's paternal grandmother had sent to her husband during the war when he was sent to a labour camp. The film played multiple Jewish festivals but failed to garner mainstream attention, something Albou attributed to the many scenes of graphic nudity in the film. Albou's third feature film My Shortest Love Affair, which she co-starred in, was released in 2015.

Styles and themes
Karin's heritage explains some of the themes she chooses to cover. Raised in the Jewish faith, Karin's films explore the lasting trauma of the Holocaust – French colonialism, secret identity, exile, assimilation, and double diaspora.

The director also explores and challenges the rules of religion and marriage and the themes of love, sex and family values. Her themes involve bringing intimate scenes of female spaces, tackling sexual dysfunction in marriage and uncovering how culture impacts the idea of romance. Karin keeps these themes consistent in her films and portrays them with her unique film style. Her style focuses on the representation of women. In The Wedding Song, the film style displays a lesbian, female, and Orientalist gaze.

Partial filmography

As director

Feature films 
 Little Jerusalem (2005)
 The Wedding Song (2008)
 My Shortest Love Affair (2015)

Short films
 Hush! (Chut!) (1992)
 Id El Kébir (1998)
 The Innocent (L’Innocent) (2001 TV short)
 Lady's Body (Corps de dame) (2009 TV short)
 Yasmine and the revolution ( 2011)

Documentary films
 My Country Left Me (1994)
 Tunisian Autumn (2014)

As actress

Feature films 
 My Shortest Love Affair (dir. Karin Albou)
 The Wedding Song (dir Karin Albou)

Short films 
 Corps de dame

Awards, nominations, and festival screenings

The Wedding Song was nominated for 6 awards at the 10th edition of the International Images Film Festival, Harare

Bibliography

See also
 List of female film and television directors

References

"École Supérieure De Réalisation Audiovisuelle." Wikipedia. June 30, 2018. École Supérieure de Réalisation Audiovisuelle.
"Karin Albou." IMDb. 2018. Karin Albou.
"Karin Albou." Wikipedia. October 4, 2018. .
"My Country Left Me." Jewish Film Festival. 2018. My Country Left Me.
"Karin Albou." Adequate Agence Artistique. 2013. ADÉQUAT - Agence artistique, Paris.
"Karin Albou." Pyramide Films. 2010. Karin Albou.
Zimmermann, Nayeli, Eric Van Grasdorff, and Patrick Gschwind. "Namibian Premiere of the Tunisian/French Film "The Wedding Song", Directed by Karin Albou, WED, 14 March 2012, 18:30h, FNCC."

Namibian Premiere Of The Tunisian/French Film "The Wedding Song", Directed By Karin Albou, WED, 14 March 2012, 18:30h, FNCC - AfricAvenir International.

Further reading
 
 Griffin, John. "Secret Identity, Sumptuous Film:" The Gazette, Oct 29, 2005.
 
 
 Pallister, Janis and Ruth Hottell, French-speaking Women Documentarians: A Guide. (New York: Lang, 2005,) 3.
 Schoonover, Karl and Rosalind Galt, Queer Cinema in the World. Durham: Duke University Press, 2017. 231–36.
 
 
 
 "Writer, Director, Actress Karin Albou in Interview." Interview by Sharon Adler. Aviva-Berlin. May 15, 2009. Writer, director, actress Karin Albou in interview - Aviva - Berlin Online Magazin und Informationsportal für Frauen aviva-berlin.de Interviews.

External links

ADÉQUAT - Agence artistique, Paris
2009: 9th Edition Awards
My Shortest Love Affair / Ma Plus Courte Histoire d'Amour
Jerusalem Jewish Film Festival - 2015
Jewish International Film Festival (Australia) - 2015
San Francisco Jewish Film Festival - 2015
My Country Left Me\
Karin Albou
Namibian Premiere Of The Tunisian/French Film "The Wedding Song", Directed By Karin Albou, WED, 14 March 2012, 18:30h, FNCC - AfricAvenir International
2009: 9th Edition Awards

French women film directors
Living people
1968 births
French actresses
French people of Algerian-Jewish descent
21st-century French Sephardi Jews
Jewish French actresses
Jewish women writers
LGBT film directors
Algerian film directors
French women screenwriters
Algerian screenwriters
21st-century Algerian people